Mansergh Wall is an ice-covered cliff,  long, running east–west between Mansergh Snowfield and the head of Errant Glacier in the Churchill Mountains of Antarctica. It was named by the Advisory Committee on Antarctic Names in association with Mansergh Snowfield.

References

Cliffs of the Ross Dependency
Shackleton Coast